Charles François Ribart de Chamoust (fl. 1776–1783 ) was an 18th-century French architect.

Architectural career
In 1758, Ribart planned an addition to the Champs-Élysées in Paris, to be constructed where the Arc de Triomphe now stands. It consisted of three levels, to be built in the shape of an elephant, with entry via a spiral staircase in the underbelly. The building was to have a form of air conditioning, and furniture that folded into the walls. A drainage system was to be incorporated into the elephant's trunk. The French Government, however, was not amused and turned him down.  Napoleon would later conceive a similar construction, the Elephant of the Bastille.

Little of his work now survives.

Notes

See also
James V. Lafferty, American architect who built 3 similar elephant-shaped buildings
Elephant of the Bastille, a Napoleon-era proposal to build an elephant-shaped fountain in Place de la Bastille.

Year of birth missing
Year of death missing
18th-century French architects